The Bayer designations a Velorum and A Velorum are distinct. Due to technical limitations, both designations link here. For the star
a Velorum, see HD 75063
A Velorum, see HD 72108

Velorum, a
Vela (constellation)